Elvedin "Dino" Begić (born 24 October 1960) is a Bosnian football official who was the President of the Football Association of Bosnia and Herzegovina (N/FSBiH) from 13 December 2012 until 16 March 2021.

Begić was also a member of the N/FSBiH normalization committee established by FIFA on 18 April 2011. On 7 July 2015, he was named Vice-Chairman of the UEFA Stadium and Security Committee for the period 2015–2019. He was selected as Vice-Chairman again for the period 2019–2023. In addition, Begić was the Sarajevo Canton Football Federation (FSKS) President from 19 September 2012 until 9 May 2016. Before that time, he worked as a delegate of FSKS and as a member of the FSKS committee. Since 1979, he has been the member of the Board of FK Butmir. From 1996 to 2004, he served as its president.

Begić is a graduate of the University of Sarajevo (Faculty of Transport and Communications) and serves as a Executive Director at the Sarajevo International Airport.

References

1960 births
Living people
Businesspeople from Sarajevo
Bosniaks of Bosnia and Herzegovina
University of Sarajevo alumni
Bosnia and Herzegovina chairpersons of corporations
Presidents of the Football Association of Bosnia and Herzegovina